Chiodecton pustuliferum is a species of lichen in the family Roccellaceae. Found in Madagascar, it was described as new to science in 2011.

References

Lichen species
Lichens described in 2011
Lichens of Madagascar
Roccellaceae
Taxa named by André Aptroot